Graham Henry Roblin  (18 August 1937 – 4 December 2005) was the  Archdeacon of the Army and Deputy Chaplain General to the Forces from 1989 to 1993.

Roblin was educated at  King’s College, Taunton and King’s College London and ordained in 1963. After a curacy at St Helier, Southwark he was with the Royal Army Chaplains' Department from 1966 to 1993. He was also an Honorary Chaplain to the Queen from 1987 to 1993; and Vicar of Bere Regis from  1993 to 2001.

References

People educated at King's College, Taunton
Church of England archdeacons (military)
Honorary Chaplains to the Queen
Officers of the Order of the British Empire
20th-century English Anglican priests
Alumni of King's College London
1937 births
2005 deaths
Royal Army Chaplains' Department officers